Achaea dejeanii is a species of moth of the family Erebidae first described by Jean Baptiste Boisduval in 1833. It is found in Madagascar.

References

Achaea (moth)
Moths of Madagascar
Moths of Africa
Moths described in 1833